Strzeleczki  (German: Klein Strehlitz) is a village in Krapkowice County, Opole Voivodeship, in south-western Poland. It is the seat of the gmina (administrative district) called Gmina Strzeleczki (Gemeinde Klein Strehlitz).

Since 2006 the village, like the entire county, has been officially bilingual in German and Polish.

The village has a population of 1,598. The village has one of the highest concentrations of Germans in Poland, with 18 of 20 seats on the municipal council filled by Germans.

History

This ancient market town was probably founded in the mid 13th century, around the year 1250; the first documentary mention dates to the year 1327. Its name, first recorded as Strelicz is thought to derive from a Slavic word for "archers". In 1531 the town's name was recorded in a Latin form as Parva Streletz, and in 1535 as Klein Streletz in German. This was to distinguish it from the nearby town of (Groß) Strehlitz.

The town received German town law in 1327; by this point the village was already quite large with a parish church, and since 1375 a school functioned in the village - one of the oldest in Upper Silesia. On March 13, 1428, the village was looted and burned by the Hussites. The city was again destroyed by Swedish forces during the 30 Years War in 1642.

In 1742 Klein Strehlitz came under Prussian control. In 1750 the village lost its town rights. When the Archipresbyteriate of Oberglogau was divided, Klein Strehlitz was left with a dean, and until today there is a small deanery in the town. The inhabitants of Klein Strehlitz were always Catholic; in the census of 1861, there were 1370 Catholics, 13 Protestants, and 15 Jews. Before they died out in 1769 the town belonged to the counts of Proskau, passing then to the counts of Schelitz, and then in 1789 to the Prussian state. Until 1945 it belonged to the district of Landkreis Neustadt O.S.

In the Upper Silesia plebiscite of 20 March 1921 1381 villagers voted to remain with Germany and 198 voted to join the newly created state of Poland. As a result, Klein Strehlitz remained in Germany. In 1939 the village had 1875 inhabitants.

In 1945 Silesia was given to Poland and the German population of Klein Strehlitz was largely expelled. The village was renamed Strzeleczki and annexed to the newly created Silesian Voivodeship. In 1950 it was reassigned to Opole Voivodeship, and in 1999 reassigned from Prudnik County (formerly Neustadt O.S.) to Krapkowice County. On 17 May 2006 the entire commune of Strzelecki/Klein Strehlitz was declared bilingual in German and Polish, and on 24 November 2008 the old name German name Klein Strehlitz was also made official.

The coat of arms of the town most likely comes from the Barons of Promnitz-Pless. The current emblem is based on a drawing made by Heraldic artist Otto Hupp in 1898.

The film producer Lothar Stark was born in the village.

There is a war memorial in the center of the town that commemorates the soldiers from Klein Strehlitz who died in World Wars I and II.

References

Strzeleczki